Procter Ralph Hug Jr. (March 11, 1931 – October 17, 2019) was a United States circuit judge of the United States Court of Appeals for the Ninth Circuit.

Education and career
Born in Reno, Nevada, Hug received a Bachelor of Science degree from the University of Nevada, Reno in 1953 as a member of Alpha Tau Omega fraternity and was a lieutenant in the United States Navy from 1954 to 1955. He received a Bachelor of Laws from Stanford Law School in 1958, entering private practice in Reno until 1977. He was a deputy state attorney general of Nevada, and was a general counsel to the Nevada University System from 1972 to 1976. He was a civilian aide to the United States Secretary of the Army in 1977.

Federal judicial service
On August 29, 1977, Hug was nominated by President Jimmy Carter to a seat on the United States Court of Appeals for the Ninth Circuit vacated by Ben C. Duniway. Hug was confirmed by the United States Senate on September 15, 1977, and received his commission the same day. He served as Chief Judge from 1996 to 2000. He assumed senior status on January 1, 2002. He retired from active service on November 30, 2017. Hug died on October 17, 2019.

References

Sources
 

1931 births
2019 deaths
Judges of the United States Court of Appeals for the Ninth Circuit
Politicians from Reno, Nevada
Stanford Law School alumni
United States court of appeals judges appointed by Jimmy Carter
United States Navy officers
University of Nevada, Reno alumni
20th-century American judges
21st-century American judges